Saint Anastasius of Persia (whose given name was Magundat), was originally a Zoroastrian soldier in the Sasanian army. He later became a convert to Christianity and was martyred in 628.

Biography
Anastasius was born in the city of Ray. He was the son of a magus named Bau. He had a brother whose name is unknown. He was a cavalryman in the army of Khosrow II (r. 590–628) and participated in the capture of the True Cross in Jerusalem, which was carried to the Sasanian capital Ctesiphon.

The occasion prompted him to ask for information about the Christian religion. He then experienced a conversion of faith, left the army, became a Christian, and afterwards a monk at the monastery of Saint Savvas (Mar Saba) in Jerusalem. He was baptized by Modestus, receiving the Christian name Anastasius to honor the resurrection of Jesus Christ ("Anástasis" in Greek).

After seven years of monastic observance, he was moved by the Holy Ghost to go in quest of martyrdom and went to Caesarea, then subject to the Sasanians. There he interrupted and ridiculed the Zoroastrian priests for their religion, and was as a result arrested by the local marzban, taken prisoner, cruelly tortured to make him abjure, and finally carried down near the Euphrates, to a place called Barsaloe (or Bethsaloe according to the Bollandists), where his tortures were continued while at the same time the highest honors in the service of King Khosrow II as a magus were promised him if he would renounce Christianity.

Finally, after refusing to abjure, with seventy others, he was strangled to death and decapitated on January 22, 628.

Veneration
His body, which was thrown to the dogs but left untouched by them, was carried from the place of his martyrdom to Palestine, then to Constantinople, and finally to Rome where the relics were venerated at the Tre Fontane Abbey.

A Passio  written in Greek was devoted to the saint. An adapted Latin translation, possibly by Archbishop Theodore of Canterbury, was available to the Anglo-Saxon church historian Bede, who criticized the result and took it upon himself to 'improve' it. There are no surviving manuscripts of Bede's revision, though one did survive as late as the 15th century.

His feast day is 22 January.

References

Sources

Acta SS., 3 Jan.
Butler, Lives of the Saints, 22 Jan.
Laistner, M.L.W.; King, H.H. (1943). A Hand-List of Bede Manuscripts. Ithaca, NY: Cornell University Press.

Further reading
Franklin, Carmela Vircillo. The Latin dossier of Anastasius the Persian: hagiographic translations and transformations. Pontifical Institute of Mediaeval Studies, Studies and Texts 147. Toronto, 2004.

External links
Saint Anastasius in the Catholic Forum
Saint Anastasiοs (Perses) from an Orthodox website
Colonnade Statue in St Peter's Square

6th-century births
628 deaths
Persian saints
Converts to Christianity from Zoroastrianism
7th-century Christian martyrs
People executed by the Sasanian Empire
7th-century Iranian people
Christians in the Sasanian Empire
People from Ray, Iran